General elections were held in Peru on 22 October 1939 to elect the President and both houses of the Congress. In the presidential elections the result was a victory for Manuel Prado Ugarteche of the Concentración Nacional coalition, who received 77.5% of the vote. The Concentración Nacional also won a landslide victory in the Congressional elections, winning 45 of the 48 seats in the Senate and 111 of the 140 seats in the Chamber of Deputies.

Results

President

Senate

Chamber of Deputies

References

General
Elections in Peru
Peru
Presidential elections in Peru
Election and referendum articles with incomplete results